Tritonia hombergii is a species of dendronotid nudibranch. It is a marine gastropod mollusc in the family Tritoniidae.

Tritonia hombergii is the type species of the genus Tritonia.

Distribution
This species was described from Le Havre, France. It is frequently found in the NE Atlantic Ocean feeding on the soft coral Alcyonium digitatum.

References

External links 
 

Tritoniidae
Gastropods described in 1803
Taxa named by Georges Cuvier